Ferrando may refer to:

 Ferrando, an Italian surname
 161545 Ferrando, an asteroid
 Ferrando Bertelli, Italian engraver